The George Dyas House is a historic house located south of Bellevue, Iowa. It is one of over 217 limestone structures in Jackson County from the mid-19th century, of which 101 are houses.

Description and history 
This is one of three houses in the Bellevue area that feature elements of the Gothic Revival style; Spring Side and the House at 505 Court Street being the other two. The 2½-story house features coursed cut stone block with dressed stone lintels, a three bay facade on the eave side, and a projecting front gable. Another element that differentiates it from the other stone house's in the county are the long windows in the formal rooms. It appears like it may have originally had a wraparound porch on the south and east sides of the structure, however there are no records showing the existence of a porch. The house was listed on the National Register of Historic Places in 1991.

The Dyas family were allowed to settle in this area before it was officially opened for settlement. A log cabin was built on the claim. Other family members followed in 1833, and the siblings built houses within a mile or so of the original cabin.

References

Houses completed in 1850
Gothic Revival architecture in Iowa
Houses in Jackson County, Iowa
National Register of Historic Places in Jackson County, Iowa
Houses on the National Register of Historic Places in Iowa